Nak is a Thai computer-animated dark fantasy horror film that was released on April 3, 2008 and aired on TV in Thai PBS Kids.

The story is based on ghosts of the folklore of Thailand, who in this movie shed their sinister reputation and are the heroes. Nak, its central character, is based on the figure of Mae Nak, a Thai female spirit that has a baby and can stretch her arms. Nak's striking fuchsia-colored hair and eyes in this movie are a departure from her alleged looks in traditional lore though. Other spirits familiar to Thai people that appear in this movie are Phi Hua Kat, Krahang, Krasue, Phi Am, Nang Tani, Nang Takian and Phi Phong.

Ghosts from other backgrounds such as Phi Yipun, the scary woman with long, stringy black hair wearing a white gown, a well-known vengeful ghost (onryō) from Japanese horror films based on the Yotsuya Kaidan story, also have a role in the Nak movie.

Plot

Led by Nak and her friends, the ghosts of Thai popular tradition fight against a powerful evil spirit that threatens mankind.

Voice cast

See also
Mae Nak Phra Khanong
Ghosts in Thai culture
Thai folklore

References

External links

NAK นาค (2008)
Nak animation
Nak trailer

2008 animated films
2008 films
2008 computer-animated films
2000s children's animated films
Cel-shaded animation
Thai horror films
Thai children's films
Thai animated films
Thai-language films
2000s ghost films
Films about witchcraft
Films based on Mae Nak Phra Khanong
Sahamongkol Film International films
Films set in Bangkok
Children's horror films
Animated horror films